FireKeepers Casino Hotel is a  casino and hotel in Emmett Charter Township, Michigan, between Battle Creek and Marshall. It is owned and operated by the Nottawaseppi Huron Band of Potawatomi. Construction began May 7, 2008, and the casino opened to the general public on August 5, 2009. Construction was a joint venture between Shingobee Builders and Clark Construction. The hotel and other additions opened in December 2012.

Description
The casino has 2,900 state-of-the art slot machines, and 76 table games, including blackjack, roulette, craps, big six and baccarat. It has five restaurants, including a buffet, and also a sports bar and cabaret. The gaming floor occupies , and there are 3,000 parking spaces, 2,080 of them in a covered garage. Casino officials had more than 20,000 applicants for 1,500 positions before opening.

FireKeepers was developed by Gaming Entertainment Michigan (GEM), a joint venture of gaming operator Full House Resorts and real estate developer Robert Mathewson. From its opening, GEM signed an agreement to manage the casino through August 2016, receiving 26 percent of net income. The Nottawaseppi Huron Band bought out the agreement four years early for $97.5 million, and took over management in May 2012.

The casino advertises via a huge electronic sign on the I-94 freeway, the heavily traveled corridor between Detroit and Chicago. It is double sided (there is one unit on each side of the sign), and each side has 43,000 full-color pixels. The sign can display 281 trillion colors, significantly more than the human eye can distinguish. Content is sent via wireless broad band communication from the casino marketing office. The sign uses energy-saving LED technology, and the cost of its energy consumption will be about $17.59 per day. More than 47,000 vehicles travel pass the FireKeepers Casino location daily, and the sign is expected to be seen by more than 66,000 persons each day.

The tribe expanded the complex in 2012, completing construction and opening an eight-story, 243-room hotel in December of that year. The expansion included: a new grand lobby featuring a symbolic light totem, porte cochere, an event center, new restaurant, and smoke-free gaming area.

The tribe announced that FireKeepers Casino would sponsor the June 2016 NASCAR Sprint Cup race at Michigan International Speedway, now called the FireKeepers Casino 400.

References

External links

Casinos in Michigan
Hotels in Michigan
Casinos completed in 2009
Hotel buildings completed in 2012
Casino hotels
2009 establishments in Michigan
Nottawaseppi Huron Band of Potawatomi